Crofton House School, located in the neighbourhood of Kerrisdale in Vancouver, British Columbia, Canada, is a private university-preparatory school for girls that is tied for first place in the Fraser Institute's rankings of schools in British Columbia.

History 

Crofton House School was founded in 1898 by educational pioneers, the Gordon sisters, Jessie Fisher Gordon LL.D. and Mary Elizabeth Gordon. 

The school was founded in the Gordons' family home on Georgia Street, Vancouver, with just four girls. Three years later, in 1901, the school moved to the corner of Jervis and Nelson in the West End. 

The ivy leaf, the emblem of the Gordon clan, was chosen as the school emblem, and the motto became "servabo fidem" (I shall keep faith). Crofton was a boarding school until 1990. The old boarding house is now used as the main administrative building, called "The Old Residence".

In 1937, the Misses Gordon retired and Crofton House School became an educational trust. Miss Sara E.G. Macdonald became Headmistress and in 1942 the school moved to the present  site on West 41st Avenue in Kerrisdale. On the day of its 90th birthday, the school received its own coat of arms, granted by the Lord Lyon. To mark this occasion the Rev. Dr. T. Herbert O'Driscoll wrote a hymn for the school, "We Thank You Lord For all the Years".

Senior school 
In Mathematics, French, English, Spanish, Mandarin and the Sciences, students who demonstrate high ability are given the opportunity to accelerate their programs, finishing grade 12 in their eleventh year. This would allow them to pursue an enriched Board Authority/Authorized course designed to meet students' interests in Economics, World History, Calculus, European History, English Language, Literature, Physics, Chemistry, French, Spanish, Chinese, and Human Geography. The Senior School also offers Advanced Placement courses to grade 11 and 12 students. The academic programs at Crofton House School are very rigorous and only select students may participate in accelerated courses.

The senior school operates on a rotating 8-day 8-block cycle, with four 80-minute blocks each day.

Until the 2010-2011 school year, the Senior School year was divided into three terms. The school has since shifted to an accumulative marking system. Report cards and student profiles are sent home at the end of each term. Electives - including Art, Drama, Music, Foods, IT, and Textiles - at the grade 8 level are compulsory quarter courses, while electives at the grade 9 and 10 levels are student-chosen half-year courses.

Junior school 
The junior school housed students from grades 1 through 6 until the 2004–2005 school year. Grade 7 was then transitioned down to join the junior school.
Junior school students are required to take classes in Mathematics, Science, English, Social Studies, and French class from grade 1.

ECE Centre 
The ECE Centre (Early Childhood Education Centre) houses students aged 4 and 5 in junior kindergarten and senior kindergarten.

Uniform 
Crofton students wear the Gordon tartan, in honour of the school's founders, the Misses Jessie and Mary Gordon. They also wear a white blouse or a white polo shirt. Students from grades 1-3 will wear a Tunic, and students from grades 4-12 will wear a skirt. Proper outerwear is a blazer for assemblies and special events, or a cardigan, pullover, or fleece. Graduating classes from the Junior School and Senior School also have special outerwear that only they can wear. After spring break, the students switch from wearing knee-high navy socks to knee-high white ones.

Athletic uniform 
During Physical Education classes, students change from their school uniform into their P.E. uniform which consists of a white T-shirt, navy blue gym shorts, white sports socks and running shoes.

Notable alumnae 
 Lauren Wilkinson, Olympic medalist, Rowing

References

External links 
Crofton House School

Private schools in British Columbia
Educational institutions established in 1898
Elementary schools in Vancouver
High schools in Vancouver
Girls' schools in Canada
1898 establishments in British Columbia